Darren Webber (born 18 August 1971) is an Australian cricketer. He played in 44 first-class and 27 List A matches for South Australia between 1992 and 1998.

See also
 List of South Australian representative cricketers

References

External links
 

1971 births
Living people
Australian cricketers
South Australia cricketers
Cricketers from Adelaide